CliffsNotes are a series of student study guides. The guides present and create literary and other works in pamphlet form or online. Detractors of the study guides claim they let students bypass reading the assigned literature. The company claims to promote the reading of the original work and does not view the study guides as a substitute for that reading.

Company history 
CliffsNotes was started by Nebraska native Clifton Hillegass in 1958. He was working at Nebraska Book Company of Lincoln, Nebraska, when he met Jack Cole, the co-owner of Coles, a Toronto book business. Coles published a series of Canadian study guides called Coles Notes, and sold Hillegass the U.S. rights to the guides.

Hillegass and his wife, Catherine, started the business in their basement at 511 Eastridge Drive in Lincoln, with sixteen William Shakespeare titles. By 1964, sales reached one million Notes annually. CliffsNotes now exist for hundreds of works. The term "Cliff's Notes" has now become a proprietary eponym for similar products. 

IDG Books purchased CliffsNotes in 1998 for $14.2 million. John Wiley & Sons acquired IDG Books (renamed Hungry Minds) in 2001.  In 2011, CliffsNotes announced a joint venture with Mark Burnett, a TV producer.  This would be a series of 60-second video study guides of literary works.  In 2012, CliffsNotes was acquired by Houghton Mifflin Harcourt. In 2021, CliffsNotes was acquired by Course Hero.

See also 
 60second Recap
 BookRags
 Enotes
 Masterplots
 Schaum's Outlines
 Shmoop
 SparkNotes
 York Notes

References

External links 

CliffsNotes website

Houghton Mifflin Harcourt franchises
Study guides
Wiley (publisher)
Book series introduced in 1958
Wiley (publisher) books
Companies based in Lincoln, Nebraska